Florine Valdenaire (born 22 January 1982) is a French snowboarder. She competed in the women's parallel giant slalom event at the 2002 Winter Olympics.

References

1982 births
Living people
French female snowboarders
Olympic snowboarders of France
Snowboarders at the 2002 Winter Olympics
People from Remiremont
Sportspeople from Vosges (department)
21st-century French women